Jean Verbrugge (16 December 1896 – 7 January 1964) was a Belgian orthopedic surgeon, professor at Ghent University, and the inventor of the Verbrugge forceps as well as other surgical tools. Early in his career, he was also an accomplished fencer who competed for Belgium at the 1920 and 1928 Summer Olympics.

Dr. Verbrugge was the author of 175 publications on orthopedic medicine, and President of the Belgian Orthopedic Association three times.

References

1896 births
1964 deaths
Belgian male fencers
Belgian foil fencers
Olympic fencers of Belgium
Fencers at the 1920 Summer Olympics
Fencers at the 1928 Summer Olympics